Skylight is a novel by Portuguese writer José Saramago.

The manuscript was submitted in 1953 and misplaced by the publisher. Upon its rediscovery 36 years later, Saramago decided to withhold its publication until his death. Skylight was published in Portugal in 2011, one year after the writer's death, and features a foreword penned by Saramago's widow, Pilar del Río, detailing his response to its rediscovery. It has been translated into English by Margaret Jull Costa.

The novel explores the lives of various characters in a shabby Lisbon apartment building in the 1940s.

Skylight was actually the second book written by the author. Shortly after the publication of his first novel, Terra do Pecado, Saramago sent Claraboia's writings to a Portuguese publisher, which never sent him an answer about what to do with the book.

References

2011 novels
21st-century Portuguese novels
Novels by José Saramago
Portuguese-language novels
Fiction set in the 1940s
Novels set in Lisbon
Novels published posthumously